Unelcus is a genus of longhorn beetles of the subfamily Lamiinae, containing the following species:

 Unelcus bolivianus Breuning, 1966
 Unelcus lineatus Bates, 1885
 Unelcus pictus Thomson, 1864

References

Desmiphorini